Degrassi Talks is a Canadian non-fiction documentary television miniseries and part of the Degrassi franchise created by Linda Schuyler and Kit Hood. Running six episodes from February 29 to March 30, 1992, it revolved around six actors from Degrassi Junior High and Degrassi High taking the role of journalists, interviewing teenagers across Canada about various topics that had been addressed in the series including abuse, substance addiction, homophobia, and teenage pregnancy. The series also included man-on-the-street interviews as well as statistics on screen. The theme song was composed by actors Stacie Mistysyn and Keith White. Coinciding with the series, companion books based on the episodes were released by Boardwalk Books, with interviews of the actors as introductions. 

The show received critical acclaim, but proved less popular with teenage viewers, who felt the information provided to be redundant and at times perpetuating certain stereotypes.

Premise and production 
Degrassi actors Rebecca Haines (Kathleen), Neil Hope (Wheels), Pat Mastroianni (Joey), Stacie Mistysyn (Caitlin), Siluck Saysanasy (Yick), and Amanda Stepto (Spike) travelled around Canada to discuss health and social issues with other teenagers. 

Degrassi Talks was created by Linda Schuyler and Kit Hood. The series was funded by the ministry of then Health Minister Benoît Bouchard, who contributed $300,000 to the development of the series.

Promotion began for the series as early as November 1990, with an extensive transit and flyer ad campaign. Following this, a toll-free number was advertised. Five hundred teenagers called, of which most of the forty seen in the series were selected to be interviewed on camera. Each episode was hosted by an actor from the series whose character experienced the issue discussed. The cast members were put through production workshops and taught how to handle video equipment. The filming of the show took place in early-mid 1991, shortly before principal photography began on the telemovie School's Out.

The actors conducted interviews across the country, staging both candid and man-on-the-street interviews in a journalistic fashion. and recording what Schuyler described as "miles of footage". The actors stopped at 26 cities, including the country's major cities as well as smaller cities such as Grand Centre in Alberta, Whitehorse in the Yukon, and Peggy's Cove in Nova Scotia. The show also displayed relevant clips from the Degrassi series, as well as facts and statistics on-screen. Schuyler said at the time that PBS, who aired Degrassi in the United States, had been interested in the series.

Theme song 
The show's theme is a duet composed by Keith White, who played Tim O'Connor, and sung by him and Stacie Mistysyn. At the time, Mistysyn had been rehearsing with an unnamed band, and she and White had begun collaborating in creating music. The opening sequence features shots of Mistysyn and White recording the song in a studio.

Release 
The first episode, "...On Sex", was screened for a group of Ottawa high school students on February 12, 1992, with the six main hosts in attendance. It then ran on CBC from February 24 to March 30, 1992. The series was re-run in 1995 on CBC. That same year, the series also aired in the United States on WNET as well as Australia on ABC TV.

Reception 
Degrassi Talks garnered a positive reception from television critics at the time of its release. In a profile of the series for the Montreal Gazette, writer Mike Boone gave the series a positive review. Boone called it a "rare series" in what he described as a "teenless wasteland" on Canadian television, citing a lack of teen-oriented programming on the country's television networks. He further stated that the series featured "faces and voices seldom heard or seen on prime-time network TV". Erick Kohanik of The Hamilton Spectator praised the premiere episode Sex for its "frank talk", also noting how it had a "good street feel". Hester Riches of the Vancouver Sun compared it to "a typical Degrassi episode [...] working in a non-judgmental way". Joan Weller of The Ottawa Citizen similarly praised the companion books, noting how the actors also discuss their own relations to the problems in the introductions.

Despite being critically acclaimed, the initial Ottawa screening drew a mixed reaction. One student asked the cast members why the only person with HIV depicted in the episode was effeminate. A journalist from the Waterloo Region Record interviewed a group of students from the area, the majority of whom panned the series or viewed it as unnecessary, with one student stating: "I thought it insulted my intelligence."

Degrassi Talks was nominated for the Gemini Award for Best Youth Program or Series in 1993.

Episodes

Books 

To coincide with the debut of the series in February 1992, Boardwalk Books published companion books based from the six episodes. The books, which contain more content than the television series, feature an image the host of the episode, usually while holding camera equipment on the front cover, and a preface written by Degrassi writer Catherine Dunphy, profiling the actor who hosted the episode. The books also feature expanded versions of several interviews seen in the series, as well as other interviews that were not shown in the series due to time constraints.

Home releases
Degrassi Talks was packaged in the Degrassi Junior High DVD set released in October 2005.

References

Further reading

External links

Degrassi Talks page on Degrassi.ca, contains viewable excerpts from the companion books

1992 Canadian television series debuts
1992 Canadian television series endings
Talks
CBC Television original programming
Television series by DHX Media
1990s Canadian television talk shows
1990s Canadian documentary television series
Television series about teenagers